Il Calendario del Popolo is a cultural and political magazine published in Italy since 1945.

History and profile
Il calendario del popolo was founded in March 1945 in Rome by the intellectual and theatre critic Giulio Trevisani. Issued monthly during 65 years, it is a quarterly publication since 2010. The editors in chief have been prominent personalities of Italian culture like Carlo Salinari - literary critic and partisan in Rome - and Franco Della Peruta, historian. The magazine, supported by very active subscribers, acculturated the proletarian masses of the Italian post-war society, promoting several cultural initiatives and events like the Prize for dialect poetry "Premio Cattolica - Il Calendario del Popolo" which in 1950 - at its first edition - awarded the still unknown young writers and poets Pier Paolo Pasolini and Tonino Guerra.

Since 1964, the publisher has been Nicola Teti owner and founder of the Milan based publishing house "Teti Editore". Currently the publisher is "Sandro Teti Editore" publishing house, based in Rome.

See also
 List of magazines in Italy

References

 Stephen Gundle, Between Hollywood and Moscow: the Italian communist and the challenge of mass culture,1943-1991, Duke University Press 2000
 David Forgacs, Stephen Gundle, Mass Culture and Italian society from fascism to the Cold War, Indiana University Press 2007
 Christopher Duggan, Christopher Wagstaff, Italy in the Cold War: politics, culture and society, 1948-58, Berg 1995
 Frederick May Foundation for Italian Studies, Altro Polo, a volume of Italian studies, University of Sydney 1978

1945 establishments in Italy
Italian-language magazines
Political magazines published in Italy
Magazines established in 1945
Magazines published in Rome
Monthly magazines published in Italy
Quarterly magazines published in Italy